Love in Paris is an Indonesian drama series co-produced by Screenplay Productions and TV5Monde, aired on SCTV in Indonesia and globally on TV5Monde from October 22, 2012 to June 28, 2013, whilst it runs in Malaysia only for its first season on private network TV3 in late 2013 to early 2014 for its afternoon slot. This series has reached 2 seasons with 116 episodes. Notable cast members are Michelle Ziudith, Dimas Anggara, Yunita Siregar, and Rio Dewanto.

Awards

Controversy
On December 27, 2012, filing of Love in Paris was taking place in Harapan Kita Hospital's ICU in Jakarta until 2:00 a.m., with the result that a child patient with leukemia, Ayu Tria (7), was not able to receive their regular dose of chemotherapy and died.

References

Indonesian television series
2012 Indonesian television series debuts
2013 Indonesian television series endings
SCTV (TV network) original programming
Television shows set in Paris